Clouded tiger may refer to:

Clouded leopard, Neofelis nebulosa
Marbled cat, Pardofelis marmorata
Calico cat, a domestic cat of any breed with a tri-color coat
Tortoiseshell cat, a domestic cat coat coloring named for its similarity to tortoiseshell material

References